is a Japanese regional daily newspaper published mainly in Iwate prefecture. The company is based in Morioka.

External links
 Iwate Nippo

Daily newspapers published in Japan
Mass media in Morioka, Iwate